The men's decathlon event at the 2015 European Athletics U23 Championships was held in Tallinn, Estonia, at Kadriorg Stadium on 11 and 12 July.

Medalists

Results

Final
11/12 July

Participation
According to an unofficial count, 17 athletes from 12 countries participated in the event.

References

Decathlon
Combined events at the European Athletics U23 Championships